Antalaha District is a district in northeastern Madagascar. The district contains the Masoala Peninsula, and is limited by Antongil Bay in south-west and the Indian Ocean on east. It is a part of Sava Region and borders the districts of Sambava into the north, Andapa to the north-west and Maroantsetra to the west. At the time of the last Madagascar census in 1993 149,684 inhabitants lived in this district. 

The main town and district capital is Antalaha

Communes
The district is divided into 16 communes (from north to south) with population data based on projections for 2018:

 Ambalabe - 16,988 inhabitants
 Ambinanifaho - 13,307 inhabitants
 Ambohitralanana - 16,853 inhabitants
 Ampahana - 24,732 inhabitants
 Ampanavoana - 13,556 inhabitants
 Ampohibe - 27,050 inhabitants
 Andampy - 7,399 inhabitants
 Antalaha - 44,556 inhabitants
 Antananambo - 17,091 inhabitants
 Antombana - 20,659 inhabitants
 Antsahanoro - 15,847 inhabitants
 Antsambalahy - 10,946 inhabitants
 Lanjarivo - 18,861 inhabitants
 Marofinaritra - 16,930 inhabitants
 Sarahandrano - 7,097 inhabitants
 Vinanivao - 11,049 inhabitants

 Total - 282,921 inhabitants

Infrastructures
The National road 5a connects the town with Sambava (81 km) and Ambilobe in the North. Antalaha has a maritime harbour. The local airport is situated at 12km west of Antalaha.

National Parks
The Masoala National Park.

Rivers
The Ambinany river, Ankavanana, Onive (nord) and Ankavia.

References

Districts of Sava Region